Nelson Victor Carter VC (6 April 1887 – 30 June 1916) was an English recipient of the Victoria Cross, the highest and most prestigious award for gallantry in the face of the enemy that can be awarded to British and Commonwealth forces.

Carter was born on 6 April 1887 to Richard Carter, of Hailsham; husband of Kathleen Carter, of 33 Greys Road, Old Town, Eastbourne. His date of birth is often stated as the ninth, but his birth certificate states the sixth.

He was 29 years old, and a company sergeant major in the 12th Battalion, Royal Sussex Regiment, British Army when he died during the First World War. He was awarded the VC for his actions on 30 June 1916 at Boar's Head, Richebourg l'Avoue, France:

He was buried in the Royal Irish Rifles Churchyard, Laventie, France in Plot VI. Row C. Grave 17. His Victoria Cross is at the Eastbourne Redoubt Museum, Royal Parade, Eastbourne, East Sussex.  A blue plaque can be seen on the wall of his home at 33 Greys Road in Eastbourne.

References
Notes

Bibliography
Monuments to Courage (David Harvey, 1999)
The Register of the Victoria Cross (This England, 1997)
 
 Burial location of Nelson Carter
 News Item "Nelson Carter's Victoria Cross donated to the Royal Sussex Regiment Museum"

External links
Redoubt Fortress Museum 
Eastbourne Redoubt
The Royal Sussex Living History Group Website - Source of much information on The Royal Sussex Regiment including The Battle of the Boar's Head

1887 births
1916 deaths
Royal Sussex Regiment soldiers
British World War I recipients of the Victoria Cross
British military personnel killed in World War I
British Army personnel of World War I
People from Eastbourne
British Army recipients of the Victoria Cross
Military personnel from Sussex